Umatilla High School may refer to:

United States 

 Umatilla High School (Florida), Umatilla, Florida
 Umatilla High School (Oregon), Umatilla, Oregon